55 North Maple was a Canadian afternoon television series which aired on CBC Television in the 1970-1971 television season. The programme was a fusion of talk show, how-to and situation comedy.

Premise
A magazine author (Max Ferguson) lives in a house at 55 North Maple with his sister (Joan Drewery) and her husband who was not cast but whose presence is implied. This premise provides a pretext to host various guests to demonstrate food preparation, redecoration or other how-to topics. In one episode, Ferguson described how to make carrot whiskey for guest Harry Freedman, while Drewery hosted other guests to illustrate interior decoration and fashion. A CBC statement described the production as "an information show in semi-dramatic form."

Production
55 North Maple was produced by Elsa Franklin in Toronto at the studios of Robert Lawrence Productions. John Ross was the programme's executive producer who allowed Ferguson "full scope for his inventive genius" and intended that the episodes would be unscripted. This marked a rare television production for Ferguson.

The 1973 Canadian series The Real Magees was a subsequent attempt to produce another talk show which was structured around storyline elements.

Scheduling
The half-hour programme aired weekday afternoons at 1:30 p.m. (Eastern).

References

External links
 
 

CBC Television original programming
1970 Canadian television series debuts
1971 Canadian television series endings
Television shows filmed in Toronto